Xiao Yishan (蕭一山, 7 May 1902 – 4 July 1978) was a modern Chinese historian.

Biography 

Xiao Yishan entered Peking University in 1921, learned from the prominent scholar Liang Qichao. He later taught history of Qing Dynasty at Tsinghua University, Henan University, Northeastern University and Northwest University. In winter 1948, Xiao moved to Taiwan. General History of the Qing Dynasty is his masterpiece, in that book he promoted a historical view of nationalism.

References

Republic of China historians
National University of Peking alumni
Academic staff of Tsinghua University
Academic staff of Henan University
Academic staff of the Northeastern University (China)
Writers from Xuzhou
Academic staff of the National Taiwan University
1902 births
1978 deaths
20th-century Taiwanese historians
Educators from Xuzhou
Historians from Jiangsu